The Dearborn School is an historic school building at 25 Ambrose Street in the Roxbury neighborhood of  Boston, Massachusetts.  The three-story brick Beaux Arts school was designed by Roxbury native Edwin James Lewis, Jr., and built in 1905.  It is the only building to survive a c. 1950 urban redevelopment of the area.  It was named in honor of Boston mayor Henry A. S. Dearborn.  It served as an elementary or middle school until the 1980s, and has since been converted into housing.

The building was listed on the National Register of Historic Places in 2000.

See also
National Register of Historic Places listings in southern Boston, Massachusetts

References

School buildings completed in 1905
School buildings on the National Register of Historic Places in Massachusetts
Roxbury, Boston
National Register of Historic Places in Boston
1905 establishments in Massachusetts